Kim Jung-gil (born 28 May 1986) is a South Korean para table tennis player. He won a silver medal at the 2012 Summer Paralympics and a gold at the 2016 Summer Paralympics, both in the Class 4–5 team event.

He sustained a debilitating injury while riding a mountain bike in 2004. He began playing table tennis two years later.

References

1986 births
Living people
Table tennis players at the 2012 Summer Paralympics
Table tennis players at the 2016 Summer Paralympics
Medalists at the 2012 Summer Paralympics
Medalists at the 2016 Summer Paralympics
South Korean male table tennis players
Paralympic silver medalists for South Korea
Paralympic gold medalists for South Korea
Paralympic table tennis players of South Korea
Paralympic medalists in table tennis
Sportspeople from North Gyeongsang Province
People from Gumi, North Gyeongsang
Table tennis players at the 2020 Summer Paralympics